Robert Harper (6 June 1920 – 18 December 1978) was a Scottish professional footballer. A winger, he played for Huddersfield Town. In 1946 he joined Newport County and went on to make 114 appearances for the club, scoring 12 goals. In 1951 he joined Southend United.

References

External links

1920 births
1978 deaths
Footballers from Glasgow
Scottish footballers
Association football wingers
Ayr United F.C. players
Huddersfield Town A.F.C. players
Newport County A.F.C. players
Gloucester City A.F.C. players
Southend United F.C. players
Linfield F.C. players
English Football League players